Weltrichia is a genus belonging to the extinct seed plant group Bennettitales. It is a form genus representing flower-like male pollen organs. It is associated with the female ovulate cone Williamsonia.

Description 

Although the morphology of Weltrichia is highly variable, the overall morphology consists of a central cup-like structure surrounded by a number of radially symmetrical outward projecting rays, to which are attached bivalve-shaped pollen sacs/synangia. Both the cup and rays usually (but not always) have substantial thickness, in some of the thicker species the structure is noticeably woody. The pollen is monocolpate and elliptical. In some species, additional rays project over the central cup, and attractants/resinous substances are present within the cup. The rays also sometimes have ridges, trichomes, appendages, striae and/or unipinnate (pedicellate) pollen sacs present. Species of Weltrichia appear to have primarily been wind pollinated, though some species may have been pollinated by insects, such as beetles. They were borne by the same plants that also bore female ovulate cones assigned to Williamsonia. It is unclear whether the parent plants were monoecious (having both structures on one plant) or dioecious (where each plant only has one gender of reproductive organ). At least some bearers of Weltrichia, such as Kimuriella from the Late Jurassic of Japan were low growing divaricately branching shrubs with a maximum height of 2–3 metres, while others such as Williamsonia gigas may have been more cycad-like in morphology.

Distribution 
Weltrichia is known from Asia, Europe, and North America, as well as India (which formed part of the separate landmass Gondwana at the time), spanning from the Late Triassic to the Late Jurassic/Early Cretaceous.

Species 
After Popa (2019) and subsequent literature.

References 

Bennettitales
Triassic plants
Jurassic plants